Krasnostav may refer to:

 Krasnostav, Slavuta Raion, Ukraine
 Ukrainian name of Krasnystaw, eastern Poland